The "State of Maine" is the anthem of the U.S. state of Maine, adopted as the state song in 1937. It was written and composed by Roger Vinton Snow, who died in 1953.

Lyrics
Grand State of Maine,
proudly we sing 
To tell your glories to the land, 
To shout your praises till the echoes ring. 
Should fate unkind 
send us to roam, 
The scent of the fragrant pines, 
the tang of the salty sea 
Will call us home.

CHORUS: 
Oh, Pine Tree State, 
Your woods, fields and hills, 
Your lakes, streams and rock bound coast 
Will ever fill our hearts with thrills, 
And tho' we seek far and wide 
Our search will be in vain, 
To find a fairer spot on earth 
Than Maine! Maine! Maine!

References

External links
Source at 50states.com
Page at Maine.gov
Sheet music at the International Music Score Library Project

Maine
Music of Maine
Songs about Maine